Huangpi District is one of 13 urban districts of the prefecture-level city of Wuhan, the capital of Hubei Province, China, situated on the northern (left) bank of the Yangtze River. The Sheshui enters the Yangtze at Huangpi. The district is primarily rural, but also includes important infrastructure facilities, such as Wuhan Tianhe International Airport and Wuhan North Railway Station, which is one of the main freight stations and classification yards on the Beijing–Guangzhou Railway. It is the northernmost of Wuhan's districts as well as the most spacious. On the left bank of the Yangtze, it borders the districts of Xinzhou to the east, and Jiang'an to the south, and Dongxihu to the southwest; on the opposite bank, it borders Hongshan. It also borders the prefecture-level cities of Huanggang to the northeast and Xiaogan to the northwest. The Sheshui (She River) enters the Yangtze River at Shekou in Huangpi.

The use of the character pi in Huangpi is cited in the Contemporary Chinese Dictionary as an example of usage of this infrequently encountered pronunciation for the character.

The Wuhan–Xiaogan Intercity Railway, one of the lines of the Wuhan Metropolitan Area Intercity Railway, serves parts of Huangpi District, in particular Wuhan Tianhe Airport. The rail line opened on December 1, 2016.

History
In 845 BC Marquis Wen Huang Meng (aka Huang Zhang) moved the capital of the State of Huang from Yicheng to Huangchuan (present-day Huangchuan, Henan). Huang Xi's descendants ruled State of Huang until 648 BC when it was destroyed by the State of Chu. The Marquis of Huang, Marquis Mu Huang Qisheng, fled to the state of Qi. The people of Huang were forced to relocate to Chu. They settled in the region of present-day Hubei province, in a region known as the Jiangxia Prefecture during the Han dynasty (206 BC-AD 220). There are many places in this region today that were named after Huang e.g. Huanggang, Huangpi, Huangmei, Huangshi, Huangan, Huangzhou etc. A large number of the people of Huang were also relocated to regions south of the Yangtze River.

Geography

Administrative divisions

Huangpi District administers:

Climate

See also
 Yuanjisi Reservoir

References

County-level divisions of Hubei
Geography of Wuhan